The following are lists of high-grossing films.

Worldwide grosses
 List of highest-grossing films
 List of highest-grossing non-English films
 List of highest-grossing puppet films
 List of highest-grossing R-rated films
List of highest-grossing independent films
 List of films by box office admissions
 List of animated films by box office admissions
 List of highest-grossing animated films
 List of highest-grossing animated films of the 1980s
 List of highest-grossing animated films of the 1990s
 List of highest-grossing animated films of the 2000s
 List of highest-grossing animated films of the 2010s
 List of highest-grossing live-action/animated films
 List of highest-grossing adult-oriented animated films
 List of fastest-grossing films
 List of highest-grossing openings for films
 List of highest-grossing openings for animated films
 List of highest-grossing second weekends for films
  List of highest-grossing films based on video games

By genre
 List of highest-grossing Christmas films
 List of highest-grossing comedy films
 List of highest-grossing fantasy films
 List of highest-grossing horror films
 List of highest-grossing musical films
 List of highest-grossing science fiction films
 List of highest-grossing sports films
 List of highest-grossing superhero films

By person
 List of highest grossing actors
 List of highest-grossing directors
 List of highest-grossing producers

Overall grosses for films of specific nationality
 List of highest-grossing Australian films
 List of highest-grossing Bangladeshi films
 List of highest-grossing Canadian films
 List of highest-grossing Greek films
 List of highest-grossing Indian films
 List of highest-grossing Bengali films
 List of highest-grossing Hindi films
 List of highest-grossing Indian films in the overseas markets
 List of highest-grossing Punjabi films
 List of highest-grossing Tamil films
 List of highest-grossing Telugu films
 List of highest-grossing Kannada films
 List of highest-grossing Iranian films
 List of highest-grossing Japanese films
 List of highest-grossing Mexican films
 List of highest-grossing Nepali films
 List of highest-grossing Nigerian films
 List of highest-grossing Pakistani films
 List of highest-grossing Portuguese films

Regional lists
 List of highest-grossing films in Australia
 List of highest-grossing films in Austria
 List of highest-grossing films in China
 List of highest-grossing films in Hong Kong
 List of highest-grossing films in France
 List of highest-grossing films in Germany
 List of highest-grossing films in India
 List of highest domestic net collection of Hindi films
 List of highest-grossing South Indian Films
 List of highest-grossing films in Indonesia
 List of highest-grossing films in Italy
 List of highest-grossing films in Japan
 List of highest-grossing anime films in Japan
 List of highest-grossing films in Malaysia
 List of highest-grossing films in the Netherlands
 List of films that received the Diamond Film
 List of films that received the Platinum Film
 List of films that received the Golden Film
 List of highest-grossing films in Pakistan
 List of highest-grossing films in the Philippines
 List of highest-grossing films in Romania
 List of highest-grossing films in Russia
 List of highest-grossing films in Singapore
 List of highest-grossing films in South Korea
 List of highest-grossing films in the Soviet Union
 List of highest-grossing films in Taiwan
 List of highest-grossing films in Turkey
 List of highest-grossing films in the United Kingdom
 List of highest-grossing films in the United States and Canada
List of highest-grossing animated films in the United States and Canada

See also
 List of best-selling films in the United States
 List of film sequels by box-office improvement
 List of biggest box-office bombs
 List of highest-grossing media franchises
 List of films with the most weekends at number one